The history of the Jews in Lithuania spans the period from the 14th century to the present day. There is still a small community in the country, as well as an extensive Lithuanian Jewish diaspora in Israel, the United States and other countries.

Early history 
The origin of the Jews of Lithuania has been a subject of much speculation. The first reliable document attesting the presence of Jews in the Grand Duchy of Lithuania is the charter of 1388 granting privileges to the Jews in Trakai. The gathering together of the scattered Jewish settlers in sufficient numbers and with enough power to form communities and to obtain privileges from their Lithuanian rulers implies the lapse of considerable time from the first migrations. Therefore, various historians attempted to claim that Jews migrated to Lithuania earlier. For example, Abraham Harkavy (1835–1919) claimed that the first Jews migrated in the 10th century from the Khazar Khaganate (see also Khazar hypothesis of Ashkenazi ancestry). Other historians claim that Jews migrated from Germany in the 12th century. German Jews were persecuted during the era of crusades. The traditional language of the vast majority of Jews of Lithuania, Yiddish, is based largely upon the Medieval German spoken by the western Germanic Jewish immigrants. Another theory is that Jews migrated during the reign of Grand Duke Gediminas (reigned 1316–1341) attracted by his invitation of merchants and craftspeople in 1323–1324 and economic opportunities – at the time, Lithuania had no cities in the western sense of the word, no Magdeburg Rights or closed guilds. In the 14th century, the Grand Duchy of Lithuania expanded into Galicia–Volhynia (see Galicia–Volhynia Wars) and the Principality of Kiev (see Battle on the Irpin River and Battle of Blue Waters), territories already inhabited by Jews. After the death of Casimir III (1370), the condition of the Polish Jews changed for the worse. The influence of the Roman Catholic clergy at the Polish court grew; Louis of Anjou was indifferent to the welfare of his subjects, and his eagerness to convert the Jews to Christianity, together with the increased Jewish immigration from Germany, caused the Polish Jews to become apprehensive for their future.

The Charter of 1388
Duke Vytautas granted privileges to the Jews of Trakai on June 24, 1388. Later similar privileges were granted to the Jews of Brest (July 1, 1388), Grodno (1389), Lutsk, Vladimir, and other large towns. The charter was modeled upon similar documents granted by Casimir III, and earlier by Boleslaw of Kalisz, to the Jews in Poland in 1264. Therefore, it seems more than likely that influential Polish Jews cooperated with the leading Lithuanian communities in securing the charters from Vytautas.

Under the charter, the Lithuanian Jews formed a class of freemen subject in all criminal cases directly to the jurisdiction of the grand duke and his official representatives, and in petty suits to the jurisdiction of local officials on an equal footing with the lesser nobles (szlachta), boyars, and other free citizens. The official representatives of the Polish king and the grand duke were the voivode (palatine) in Poland and the elder (starosta) in Lithuania, who were known as the "Jewish judges" (judex Judæorum), and their deputies. The Jewish judge decided all cases between Christians and Jews and all criminal suits in which Jews were concerned; in civil suits, however, he acted only on the application of the interested parties. Either party who failed to obey the judge's summons had to pay him a fine. To him also belonged all fines collected from Jews for minor offenses. His duties included the guardianship of the persons, property, and freedom of worship of the Jews. He had no right to summon any one to his court except upon the complaint of an interested party. In matters of religion the Jews were given extensive autonomy.

Under these equitable laws the Jews of Lithuania reached a degree of prosperity unknown to their Polish and German co-religionists at that time. The communities of Brest, Grodno, Trakai, Lutsk, and Minsk rapidly grew in wealth and influence. Every community had at its head a Jewish elder. These elders represented the communities in all external relations, in securing new privileges, and in the regulation of taxes. Such officials are not, however, referred to by the title "elder" before the end of the 16th century. Up to that time the documents merely state, for instance, that the "Jews of Brest humbly apply," etc. On assuming office the elders declared under oath that they would discharge the duties of the position faithfully, and would relinquish the office at the expiration of the appointed term. The elder acted in conjunction with the rabbi, whose jurisdiction included all Jewish affairs with the exception of judicial cases assigned to the court of the deputy, and by the latter to the king. In religious affairs, however, an appeal from the decision of the rabbi and the elder was permitted only to a council consisting of the chief rabbis of the king's cities. The cantor, sexton, and shochet were subject to the orders of the rabbi and elder.

The goodwill and tolerance of Vytautas endeared him to his Jewish subjects, and for a long time traditions concerning his generosity and nobility of character were current among them. His cousin, the king of Poland Jogaila, did not interfere with his administration during Vytautas's lifetime.

Jagiellon rule 

In 1569, Poland and Lithuania were united (Union of Lublin). It was generally a time of prosperity and relative safety for the Jews of both countries (with the exception of the Chmielnicki Uprising in the 17th century). However, a few events, such as the expulsion of the Jews from the Grand Duchy of Lithuania between 1495 and 1503 occurred just within Lithuania.

Expulsion of the Jews in 1495 and return in 1503
Casimir was succeeded as king of Poland by his son John Albert, and on the Lithuanian throne by his younger son, Alexander Jagellon. The latter confirmed the charter of privileges granted to the Jews by his predecessors, and even gave them additional rights. His father's Jewish creditors received part of the sums due to them, the rest being withheld under various pretexts. The favorable attitude toward the Jews which had characterized the Lithuanian rulers for generations was unexpectedly and radically changed by a decree promulgated by Alexander in April 1495. By this decree all Jews living in Lithuania proper and the adjacent territories were summarily ordered to leave the country.

The expulsion was evidently not accompanied by the usual cruelties; for there was no popular animosity toward the Lithuanian Jews, and the decree was regarded as an act of mere willfulness on the part of an absolute ruler. Some of the nobility, however, approved Alexander's decree, expecting to profit by the departure of their Jewish creditors, as is indicated by numerous lawsuits on the return of the exiles to Lithuania in 1503. It is known from the Hebrew sources that some of the exiles migrated to the Crimea, and that by far the greater number settled in Poland, where, by permission of King John Albert, they established themselves in the towns situated near the Lithuanian boundary. This permission, given at first for a period of two years, was extended "because of the extreme poverty of the Jews on account of the great losses sustained by them." The extension, which applied to all the towns of the kingdom, accorded the enjoyment of all the liberties that had been granted to their Polish brethren (Kraków, June 29, 1498). The expelled Karaites settled in the Polish town of Ratno, now known as Ratne, Ukraine.

The causes of the unexpected expulsion were probably many, including religious reasons, the need to fill a depleted treasury by confiscating the Jews' money, personal animosity, and other causes.

Soon after Alexander's accession to the throne of Poland he permitted the Jewish exiles to return to Lithuania. Beginning in March 1503, as is shown by documents still extant, their houses, lands, synagogues, and cemeteries were returned to them, and permission was granted them to collect their old debts. The new charter of privileges permitted them to live throughout Lithuania as before. The return of the Jews and their attempt to regain their old possessions led to many difficulties and lawsuits. Alexander found it necessary to issue an additional decree (April 1503), directing his vice-regent to enforce the law. In spite of this some of the property was not recovered by the Jews for years.

The Act of 1566
At the same time, the middle of the 16th century witnessed a growing antagonism between the lesser nobility and the Jews. Their relations became strained, and the enmity of the Christians began to disturb the life of the Lithuanian Jews. The anti-Jewish feeling, due at first to economic causes engendered by competition, was fostered by the clergy, who were then engaged in a crusade against heretics, notably the Lutherans, Calvinists, and Jews. The Reformation, which had spread from Germany, tended to weaken the allegiance to the Roman Catholic Church. Frequent instances occurred of the marriage of Catholic women to Jews, Turks, or Tatars. The Bishop of Vilnius complained to Sigismund August (Dec., 1548) of the frequency of such mixed marriages and of the education of the offspring in their fathers' faiths. The shlyakhta also saw in the Jews dangerous competitors in commercial and financial undertakings. In their dealings with the agricultural classes the lords preferred the Jews as middlemen, thus creating a feeling of injury on the part of the shlyakhta. The exemption of the Jews from military service and the power and wealth of the Jewish tax-farmers intensified the resentment of the shlyakhta. Members of the nobility, like Borzobogaty, Zagorovski, and others, attempted to compete with the Jews as leaseholders of customs revenues, but were never successful. Since the Jews lived in the towns and on the lands of the king, the nobility could not wield any authority over them nor derive profit from them. They had not even the right to settle Jews on their estates without the permission of the king; but, on the other hand, they were often annoyed by the erection on their estates of the toll houses of the Jewish tax-collectors.

Hence when the favorable moment arrived, the Lithuanian nobility endeavored to secure greater power over the Jews. At the Diet of Vilna in 1551 the nobility urged the imposition of a special poll tax of one ducat per head, and the Volhynian nobles demanded that the Jewish tax-collectors be forbidden to erect tollhouses or place guards at the taverns on their estates.

The opposition to the Jews was finally crystallized and found definite expression in the repressive Lithuanian statute of 1566, when the Lithuanian nobles were first allowed to take part in the national legislation. Paragraph Twelve of this statute contains the following articles:

"The Jews shall not wear costly clothing, nor gold chains, nor shall their wives wear gold or silver ornaments. The Jews shall not have silver mountings on their sabers and daggers; they shall be distinguished by characteristic clothes; they shall wear yellow caps, and their wives kerchiefs of yellow linen, in order that all may be enabled to distinguish Jews from Christians."

Other restrictions of a similar nature are contained in the same paragraph. However, the king checked the desire of the nobility to modify essentially the old charters of the Jews.

In the Polish–Lithuanian Commonwealth

Effect of the Cossacks' Uprising in Lithuania

The fury of this uprising destroyed the organization of the Lithuanian Jewish communities. The survivors who returned to their old homes in the latter half of the 17th century were practically destitute. The wars which raged constantly in the Lithuanian territory brought ruin to the entire country and deprived the Jews of the opportunity to earn more than a bare livelihood. The intensity of their struggle for existence left them no time to reestablish the conditions which had existed up to 1648. John Casimir (1648–1668) sought to ameliorate their condition by granting various concessions to the Jewish communities of Lithuania. Attempts to return to the old order in the communal organization were not wanting, as is evident from contemporary documents. Thus in 1672, Jewish elders from various towns and villages in the grand duchy of Lithuania secured a charter from King Michael Wiśniowiecki (1669–1673), decreeing "that on account of the increasing number of Jews guilty of offenses against the Shlyakhta and other Christians, which result in the enmity of the Christians toward the Jews, and because of the inability of the Jewish elders to punish such offenders, who are protected by the lords, the king permits the kahals to summon the criminals before the Jewish courts for punishment and exclusion from the community when necessary." The efforts to resurrect the old power of the kahals were not successful. The impoverished Jewish merchants, having no capital of their own, were compelled to borrow money from the nobility, from churches, congregations, monasteries, and various religious orders. Loans from the latter were usually for an unlimited period and were secured by mortgages on the real estate of the kahal. The kahals thus became hopelessly indebted to the clergy and the nobility.

In 1792 the Jewish population of Lithuania was estimated at 250,000 (as compared with 120,000 in 1569). The whole of the commerce and industries of Lithuania, now rapidly declining, was in the hands of the Jews. The nobility lived for the most part on their estates and farms, some of which were managed by Jewish leaseholders. The city properties were concentrated in the possession of monasteries, churches, and the lesser nobility. The Christian merchants were poor. Such was the condition of affairs in Lithuania at the time of the second partition of Poland (1793), when the Jews became subjects of Russia.

Jewish culture in Lithuania

The founding of the yeshivot in Lithuania was due to the Lithuanian-Polish Jews who studied in the west, and to the German Jews who migrated about that time to Lithuania and Poland. Very little is known of these early yeshivot. No mention is made of them or of prominent Lithuanian rabbis in Jewish writings until the 16th century. The first known rabbinical authority and head of a yeshivah was Isaac Bezaleel of Vladimir, Volhynia, who was already an old man when Solomon Luria went to Ostroh in the fourth decade of the 16th century. Another rabbinical authority, Kalman Haberkaster, rabbi of Ostrog and predecessor of Luria, died in 1559. Occasional references to the yeshivah of Brest are found in the writings of the contemporary rabbis Solomon Luria (died 1585), Moses Isserles (died 1572), and David Gans (died 1613), who speak of its activity. Of the yeshivot of Ostrog and Vladimir in Volhynia it is known that they were in a flourishing condition at the middle of the 16th century, and that their heads vied with one another in Talmudic scholarship. Mention is also made by Gans of the head of the Kremenetz yeshivah, Isaac Cohen (died 1573), of whom but little is known otherwise.

At the time of the Lublin Union, Solomon Luria was rabbi of Ostrog, and was regarded as one of the greatest Talmudic authorities in Poland and Lithuania. In 1568 King Sigismund ordered that the suits between Isaac Borodavka and Mendel Isakovich, who were partners in the farming of certain customs taxes in Lithuania, be carried for decision to Rabbi Solomon Luria and two auxiliary rabbis from Pinsk and Tiktin.

The far-reaching authority of the leading rabbis of Poland and Lithuania, and their wide knowledge of practical life, are apparent from numerous decisions cited in the responsa. In the Eitan ha-Ezrachi (Ostrog, 1796) of Abraham Rapoport (known also as Abraham Schrenzel; died 1650), Rabbi Meïr Sack is cited as follows: "I emphatically protest against the custom of our communal leaders of purchasing the freedom of Jewish criminals. Such a policy encourages crime among our people. I am especially troubled by the fact that, thanks to the clergy, such criminals may escape punishment by adopting Christianity. Mistaken piety impels our leaders to bribe the officials, in order to prevent such conversions. We should endeavor to deprive criminals of opportunities to escape justice." The same sentiment was expressed in the 16th century by  Maharam Lublin (Responsa, § 138). Another instance, cited by Katz from the same responsa, likewise shows that Jewish criminals invoked the aid of priests against the authority of Jewish courts by promising to become converts to Christianity.

The decisions of the Polish-Lithuanian rabbis are frequently marked by breadth of view also, as is instanced by a decision of Joel Sirkes (Bayis Hadash, § 127) to the effect that Jews may employ in their religious services the melodies used in Christian churches, "since music is neither Jewish nor Christian, and is governed by universal laws."

Decisions by Luria, Meïr Katz, and Mordecai Jaffe show that the rabbis were acquainted with the Russian language and its philology. Jaffe, for instance, in a divorce case where the spelling of the woman's name as Lupka or Lubka was in question, decided that the word is correctly spelled with a "b," and not with a "p," since the origin of the name was the Russian verb  = "to love," and not  = "to beat" (Levush ha-Butz we-Argaman, § 129). Meïr Katz (Geburat Anashim, § 1) explains that the name of Brest-Litovsk is written in divorce cases "Brest" and not "Brisk," "because the majority of the Lithuanian Jews use the Russian language." It is not so with Brisk, in the district of Kujawa, the name of that town being always spelled "Brisk." Katz (a German) at the conclusion of his responsum expresses the hope that when Lithuania shall have become more enlightened, the people will speak one language only—German—and that also Brest-Litovsk will be written "Brisk."

Items from the Responsa
The responsa shed an interesting light also on the life of the Lithuanian Jews and on their relations to their Christian neighbors. Benjamin Aaron Solnik states in his Mas'at Binyamin (end of 16th and beginning of 17th century) that "the Christians borrow clothes and jewelry from the Jews when they go to church." Sirkes (l.c. § 79) relates that a Christian woman came to the rabbi and expressed her regret at having been unable to save the Jew Shlioma from drowning. A number of Christians had looked on indifferently while the drowning Jew was struggling in the water. They were upbraided and beaten severely by the priest, who appeared a few minutes later, for having failed to rescue the Jew.

Luria gives an account (Responsa, § 20) of a quarrel that occurred in a Lithuanian community concerning a cantor whom some of the members wished to dismiss. The synagogue was closed in order to prevent him from exercising his functions, and religious services were thus discontinued for several days. The matter was thereupon carried to the local lord, who ordered the reopening of the building, saying that the house of God might not be closed, and that the cantor's claims should be decided by the learned rabbis of Lithuania. Joseph Katz mentions (She'erit Yosef, § 70) a Jewish community which was forbidden by the local authorities to kill cattle and to sell meat—an occupation which provided a livelihood for a large portion of the Lithuanian Jews. For the period of a year following this prohibition the Jewish community was on several occasions assessed at the rate of three gulden per head of cattle in order to furnish funds with which to induce the officials to grant a hearing of the case. The Jews finally reached an agreement with the town magistrates under which they were to pay forty gulden annually for the right to slaughter cattle. According to Hillel ben Herz (Bet Hillel, Yoreh De'ah, § 157), Naphtali says the Jews of Vilna had been compelled to uncover their heads when taking an oath in court, but later purchased from the tribunal the privilege to swear with covered head, a practise subsequently made unnecessary by a decision of one of their rabbis to the effect that an oath might be taken with uncovered head.

The responsa of Meïr Lublin show (§ 40) that the Lithuanian communities frequently aided the German and the Austrian Jews. On the expulsion of the Jews from Silesia, when the Jewish inhabitants of Silz had the privilege of remaining on condition that they would pay the sum of 2,000 gulden, the Lithuanian communities contributed one-fifth of the amount.

Vilna Gaon

Religious observances owe greatly to Elijah ben Solomon (1720–1797), the Vilna Gaon, who lived in Lithuania's greatest city, Vilnius. His style of Torah and Talmud study shaped the analytical "Lithuanian-style" form of learning still practiced in most yeshivas. The yeshiva movement itself is a typical Lithuanian development, initiated by the Vilna Gaon's main disciple, Rabbi Chaim Volozhin.

The Misnagdim were the early opponents of Hasidic Judaism, led by the Vilna Gaon who sharply denounced the innovations by the Hasidim. Despite this, several prominent Hasidic scholars and dynasties originated from Lithuania such as Karlin-Stolin founded by Aharon of Karlin, Kopust founded by Yehuda Leib Schneersohn and Koidanov. Some Polish Hasidic dynasties even settled in Lithuania such as those of Elijah Winograd.

Lithuanian Jews under the Russian Empire 

In 1795 the final Third Partition ended the existence of the Polish–Lithuanian Commonwealth, and the former lands of the Grand Duchy of Lithuania became part of the Russian partition.

By the end of the 19th century, many of Lithuania's Jews fled Eastern Europe to escape the Anti-Jewish pogroms in the Russian Empire and the anti-Semitism. Tens of thousands of Lithuanian Jews emigrated to the United States of America and South Africa. A small number also emigrated to the British Mandate of Palestine.

Republic of Lithuania (1918–1940)

Lithuanian Jews took an active part in Freedom wars of Lithuania. On December 29, 1918, Lithuania's government called for volunteers to defend the Lithuanian state; of 10,000 volunteers more than 500 Jewish. More than 3,000 Jews served in the Lithuanian army between 1918 and 1923. Initially, the Jewish community was given a wide amount of autonomy in education and taxation through community councils, or kehillot.

By 1934, in a nationalist trend that reflected throughout Europe, the government scaled back much of this autonomy, and cases of antisemitism increased.

After the Soviet occupation in June 1940, some Jewish communists assumed significant roles in the NKVD and local communist nomenklatura. Other Jews, particularly religious Jews and Zionists, were treated harshly by the Soviet-imposed communist government in Lithuania prior to the German invasion.

Some Lithuanians, spurred on by far-right groups such as the Iron Wolf and Nazi propaganda, blamed Jews for the communist regime, and participated in the mass murder of Lithuanian Jews during the Holocaust.

World War II and the Holocaust

The Lithuanian Republic was occupied by Soviet Union in June 1940, and one year later, in June 1941, occupied by the Germans. During World War II, 91–95% of Lithuania's Jewish population were killed – almost all the Jews who had not managed to leave Lithuania and its environs. This was the highest casualty rate of Jews in any nation in the Holocaust.

The only European yeshiva to survive the Holocaust was the Mir yeshiva. With help of the Japanese consul in Kaunas, Chiune Sugihara, its leaders and students managed to escape to the Shanghai ghetto.

The Soviet era (1944–1990)

Following the expulsion of Nazi German forces in 1944, The Soviets reannexed Lithuania as a Soviet republic, and prosecuted a number of Lithuanians for collaborating with the Nazis. Sites of wartime massacres, such as the Ninth Fort near Kaunas became monuments. To avoid nationalist themes, the memorials were declared in the name of all victims, though the clear majority of them are Jewish. Most survivors never returned, moving to Israel instead. Throughout Soviet rule, there was tension between the Jewish community and the authorities over the right to emigrate to Israel, and how to properly commemorate the Holocaust. The majority of Jews in Soviet Lithuania arrived after the war, with Russian and Yiddish as their primary language.

Despite of lack of any intent to support the project, Jewish community was allowed to open the Jewish Museum in 1944 which was located in the apartment of its first director, Shmerl Kaczerginski. The institution served as a community center which received hundreds of inquiries from all across the world about the fate of individual Jews in Lithuania. In 1945 the museum was relocated to the former ghetto library and jail buildings in Vilnius. The first exhibition at the museum was titled "The Brutal Destruction of the Jews during the German Occupation". In 1949, the Council of Ministers of the Lithuanian Soviet Socialist Republic de facto closed down the museum when it ordered its reorganized into the Vilnius Local History Museum. The Vilnius Jewish School was closed in 1946, and the one in Kaunas 1950. Jewish cemetery in Vilnius was paved over,  the Old Vilnius Synagogue was razed while Jewish grave-stones were used to construct the stairs at the Tauras Hill, as well as those at the Evangelical Reformed Church.  While institutionalized Jewish memory was abolished, a few memorials were allowed to continue with at least forty-five out of 231 Holocaust memorials in Lithuania being constructed before 1991. The death of Stalin brought some improvement in the status of Lithuanian Jews, with new Jewish communities moving to the country from less developed parts of the USSR and some development of the Holocaust narrative over the years. The book Mass Murders in Lithuania was published in 1965 and 1973 as the first publication directly addressing the topic of Holokaust. The Art of Lithuania's Jews exhibition was opened in Kaunas and Vilnius in 1988 as the first public display of Jewish culture anywhere in the Soviet Union. Lithuanian Jewish Cultural Association was established in 1988 and it was renamed into the Lithuanian Jewish Community in 1991.

Jews in modern Lithuania
The Jewish population of Lithuania continues a slow decline. In the 2001 census, there were 4,007 Jews by ethnicity. This declined by 2011 to 3,050 and 2,256 by 2021. The Jews also had the oldest age profiles; 41% of Jews were in the 60+ age demographic and only 13.2% were under the age of 20. There were also 192 Karaims by ethnicity for a total of 2,448; this was a significant decrease from the number of 423 in 2011. However, Karaims have historically defined themselves as ethnically distinct from Jews in Lithuania. In both the 2001 and 2011 census, Jews were Lithuania's fifth biggest ethnic minority, behind Poles, Russians, Belarusians and Ukrainians, and just ahead of Germans.

Interest among descendants of Lithuanian Jews has spurred tourism and a renewal in research and preservation of the community's historic resources and possessions. Increasing numbers of Lithuanian Jews are interested in learning and practising the use of Yiddish. In 2000, the Jewish population of the country was 3,600.

The beginning of the 21st century was marked by conflicts between members of Chabad-Lubavitch and secular leaders. In 2005, Chief Rabbi Sholom Ber Krinsky was physically removed from the Synagogue by two men hired by the community's secular leader Mr. Alperovich, who then declared a new Chief Rabbi. For more detail, see Chabad-Lubavitch related controversies: Lithuania.

Among notable contemporary Lithuanian Jews are the brothers Emanuelis Zingeris (a member of the Lithuanian Seimas) and Markas Zingeris (writer), Ephraim Oshry (one of the few Rabbis to survive the Holocaust), Anatolijus Šenderovas (world-renowned composer, Laureate of the Lithuanian National Award and European Composer's Prize winner), Arturas Bumsteinas (composer, sound artist), Arkadijus Vinokuras (actor, publicist), Gercas Žakas (football referee), Gidonas Šapiro-Bilas (pop-singer from ŽAS), Dovydas Bluvšteinas (music producer), Leonidas Donskis (philosopher, essayist), Icchokas Meras (writer), Benjaminas Gorbulskis (composer),  Chaim Baruch Utinsky (poet), Grigorijus Kanovičius (writer), Rafailas Karpis (opera singer (tenor), David Geringas (world-renowned cellist and conductor), Liora Grodnikaitė (opera singer (mezzo-soprano), Arkadijus Gotesmanas (Jazz percussionist), Ilja Bereznickas (animator, illustrator, scriptwriter and caricaturist), Adomas Jacovskis, Marius Jacovskis, Aleksandra Jacovskytė (painters), Adasa Skliutauskaitė (painter), etc.

Public debate has ensued over memorials to Nazi collaborators. In 2019, a memorial plaque in central Vilnius was smashed with a sledgehammer by Jewish Lithuanian politician Stanislovas Tomas. Lithuanian authorities also removed several memorials of other collaborators. The removal of these memorials sparked antisemitic backlash, leading to threats against the Choral Synagogue, Vilnius's only remaining synagogue, along with the Jewish community headquarters, both of which were temporarily shuttered due to the threats.

See also 

Timeline of Jewish history in Lithuania and Belarus
History of Lithuania
Wooden synagogue

References

Further reading

External links
 Chronicles of the Vilna Ghetto: wartime photographs & documents – vilnaghetto.com
 Litvak SIG at JewishGen